Kamyshinsky District is an administrative district (raion), one of the thirty-three in Volgograd Oblast, Russia. As a municipal division, it is incorporated as Kamyshinsky Municipal District. It is located in the northeast of the oblast. Its administrative center is the city of Kamyshin (which is not administratively a part of the district). Population:  45,019 (2002 Census);

Administrative and municipal status
Within the framework of administrative divisions, Kamyshinsky District is one of the thirty-three in the oblast. The city of Kamyshin serves as its administrative center, despite being incorporated separately as a town of oblast significance—an administrative unit with the status equal to that of the districts.

As a municipal division, the district is incorporated as Kamyshinsky Municipal District. The city of oblast significance of Kamyshin is incorporated separately from the district as Kamyshin Urban Okrug.

References

Notes

Sources

Districts of Volgograd Oblast
